Reverend George Young (December 31, 1821 – August 1, 1910) was a Canadian Methodist minister and author noted for his role in the Red River Rebellion of 1869–1870.  He was a supporter of the pro-Canadian faction led by John Christian Schultz.  He is remembered today largely for his memoir of the rebellion  Manitoba memories; leaves from my life in the prairie province, 1868–1884.

References 

Young, George, Manitoba memories; leaves from my life in the prairie province, 1868–1884, Toronto, 1897.

External links 
Biography at the Dictionary of Canadian Biography Online

Young, George
Young, George
Young, George
Young, G
Young, G
You
You